Shintani (written: 新谷 lit. new valley ) is a Japanese surname. Notable people with the surname include:

Judy Shintani, Japanese American artist
, Japanese manga artist
, Japanese actress and voice actress
, Japanese judo wrestler
, Japanese voice actress and singer
, Japanese linguist
, Japanese mathematician
Terry Shintani (born 1951), American physician, attorney, nutritionist, professor, author, lecturer, radio show host and community advocate in Hawaii

References 

Japanese-language surnames